Facundo Bosch (born 8 August 1991) is an Argentine rugby union player who plays at Hooker for the national Argentina team The Pumas and Stade Rochelais.

Bosch started playing as semi-professional level in 2011 for Club Universitario de Buenos Aires where he picked up 33 appearances for his club. He played for the Jaguares in 2016. He moved to France in 2017 to play for Agen. In 2019 he was signed by Stade Rochelais.

In May 2014, he was selected for a South American XV side to face the Pumas in a pre-season friendly before the 2014 June internationals. That month, he was selected for the Argentina Jaguars ahead of the 2014 IRB Tbilisi Cup, where he made his first appearance of the bench against Emerging Italy. He started against Georgia on 18 June, but was red carded on the 70th minute for fighting with Georgian prop Giorgi Mtchedlishvili.

In 2016, Bosh was called up to the senior Argentina side ahead of the 2016 Americas Rugby Championship, but following an injury sustained in training 2 days before the first game, he was withdrawn from the side. In May 2016, he made his international debut, starting against Uruguay in the 2016 Sudamérica Rugby Cup. He was called up to the senior squad for their 2-test series against France and a test against Italy but did not make an appearance in the June window. He was later called up for the 2016 Rugby Championship.

Honours

Club 
 La Rochelle
European Rugby Champions Cup: 2021–2022

References

External links
 UAR Profile
 

Club Universitario de Buenos Aires rugby union players
Pampas XV players
Jaguares (Super Rugby) players
Rugby union hookers
Argentine rugby union players
Argentina international rugby union players
1991 births
Living people
Sportspeople from Buenos Aires Province